George Cressiac (Albanian: Gjergj Cresia), (Spanish: Georgio Cressier), (Italian: Cressiaco Albano) (fl. 1580s) was an Albanian Epirote chief and commander in service of the Duke of Parma of Spain during the Anglo-Spanish War. In September 1586, Peregrine Bertie, the 13th Baron Willoughby de Eresby, under Queen Elizabeth, commanding an English army, captured Cressiac after a duel. Cressiac then said in French: "I yield myself to you".

Background 
In 1585, Queen Elizabeth sent forces led by Lord Willoughby to aid the Protestant Netherlanders against their Spanish masters. On the 22nd of September 1586, Lord Willoughby distinguished himself in the Battle of Zutphen. A convoy, commanded by George Cressiac under the orders of the Duke of Parma, was passing by. Fighting began and Lord Willoughby, alongside Lord Audley, Sir John Norreis, and Sir Philip Sidney, attacked. The Spaniards had the higher ground and charged upon the English who helped their position. Lord Willoughby engaged George Cressiac, and defeated him. He fell into a ditch and said: "I yield myself to you, for that you be a seemly knight".

References 

Albanian generals
16th-century Albanian people
Anglo-Spanish War (1585–1604)